Giovanni Pernice (born 5 September 1990) is an Italian professional dancer based in the United Kingdom, best known for his appearances on the British television show Strictly Come Dancing. He is also an Italian Open Latin Dance Champion (2012), and the Guinness World Record holder for Jive kicks and flicks, as well as Charleston swivels. His height is 5 foot and 10 inches.

Early life
Pernice was born in Sicily, and at the age of 14 he moved to Bologna to concentrate on dance. He chose to become a dancer after watching the British ballroom dance television show Come Dancing. Specialising in Latin style, Pernice has won a number of competitions, most notably, the Italian Open Championship in 2012.

Pernice is a member of the Federazione Italiana Danza Sportiva, part of the World DanceSport Federation, and he competed at Youth and Adult levels between 2007 and 2014. Other notable results include coming second place in the International Open Latin in Slovenia in 2014, and wins in other Open competitions in Pieve di Cento, Italy (2011); Ancona, Italy (2011); San Marino (2011) and Sant Cugat del Vallès, Spain (2011). His competition dance partners include Erika Attisano (2011–2014) and Alexandra Koldan (2014–2015).

Career

Strictly Come Dancing

In 2015, Pernice appeared as a professional dancer on BBC's Strictly Come Dancing for the first time in its thirteenth series. He was partnered with former Coronation Street actress Georgia May Foote. They reached the final of the competition but finished as joint runners-up alongside Kellie Bright and her professional partner, Kevin Clifton.

In 2016, Pernice returned to Strictly Come Dancing for its fourteenth series. He was partnered with television presenter Laura Whitmore. They were eliminated in Week 7 in a dance-off with Ore Oduba and Joanne Clifton, the eventual Series 14 champions, and finished in 9th place.

In 2017, Pernice returned to Strictly Come Dancing as a professional dancer for its fifteenth series. His celebrity partner was Debbie McGee, a television and radio presenter and former ballet dancer. They reached the final of the competition, finishing as joint runners-up alongside Alexandra Burke and her professional partner Gorka Márquez, and Gemma Atkinson and her professional partner Aljaž Škorjanec.

In 2018, Pernice competed in the sixteenth series of Strictly Come Dancing, partnered with Steps singer Faye Tozer. For the third time in four years, Pernice reached the final, finishing as joint runners-up alongside Joe Sugg and his professional partner Dianne Buswell, and Ashley Roberts and her professional partner Pasha Kovalev.

In 2019, Pernice was partnered with television and radio personality Michelle Visage for the show's seventeenth series. They reached week 9 of the competition, before being eliminated in a dance-off with Saffron Barker and AJ Pritchard.

In 2020, Pernice reached the semi-final of the eighteenth series with his partner Ranvir Singh, before being eliminated in a dance off with Jamie Laing and Karen Hauer.

In 2021, Pernice won the nineteenth series of Strictly Come Dancing, with EastEnders actress, Rose Ayling-Ellis. Ayling-Ellis was the first deaf contestant to appear on the show. In the series’ Halloween special, Ayling-Ellis and Pernice received the earliest 40 throughout Strictly history with their Tango. The pair also received an 'Unmissables' Award from Heat for the silent moment in their Couple's Choice routine.

In 2022 Pernice was partnered with television and radio presenter Richie Anderson. They were eliminated in week 3 after losing the dance off to Fleur and Vito making it the earliest week Pernice has ever been eliminated in.

As a Strictly professional dancer, Pernice holds the record for most tens ever awarded, with a total of 98.  He has topped the weekly Strictly leaderboard more times than any other pro in the history of the show.

Pernice has also appeared on a number of episodes of BBC Two's Strictly Come Dancing: It Takes Two. Pernice is the current Guinness World Record holder for Jive kicks and flicks, performing 55 in 30 seconds in a challenge held in December 2016. The next year, in December 2017, he broke the world record for the most Charleston swivel steps in 30 seconds, correctly completing 24. Both records were achieved on It Takes Two with supervision by Guinness World Records.

Highest and lowest scoring performances per dance

Strictly Come Dancing Performances

Series 13; with Georgia May Foote
The couple were runners-up.

Series 14; with Laura Whitmore
Due to an ankle injury, Whitmore was unable to dance in week 5 and the couple were given a bye to progress to the next week. The couple were eliminated in week 7.

Series 15; with Debbie McGee
The couple were runners-up.

Series 16; with Faye Tozer
The couple were runners-up.

Green number indicates Faye & Giovanni were at the top of the leaderboard.

Series 17; with Michelle Visage
The couple were eliminated in week 9, at Blackpool.

Green number indicates Michelle & Giovanni were at the top of the leaderboard
Red number indicates Michelle & Giovanni were at the bottom of the leaderboard

Series 18; with Ranvir Singh
The couple were eliminated in week 8.

1 Score from guest judge Anton du Beke

Series 19; with Rose Ayling-Ellis
The Couple's Choice dance with Rose Ayling-Ellis, in week 8, featured a period of silence, included as a tribute to the deaf community. Judge Anton Du Beke described it as "the greatest thing I've ever seen on the show". it earned them the 2021 Heat Unmissables Award for TV Moment of the Year. On 18 December 2021 the couple were the series winners; it was the first win for Pernice.

Green number indicates Rose & Giovanni were at the top of the leaderboard.

Series 20; with Richie Anderson
The couple were eliminated in week 3.

Dance tours and professional dance engagements
Pernice took part in the national Strictly Come Dancing Live! tour in 2016 with his partner Georgia May Foote, and again in 2017 as part of the professional dance troupe for group numbers and professional dances. He partnered Debbie McGee in the 2018 live tour, Faye Tozer for the 2019 live tour and Rose Ayling-Ellis for the 2022 live tour. 

In 2016, Pernice announced his first dance tour Dance is Life, translated from the Italian expression 'Il Ballo è Vita'.  The tour comprised 32 dates in England, Scotland and Wales between April to July 2017, performing to positive reviews. The opening night was 26 April 2017 at the Albany Theatre, Coventry. The last performance took place on 23 July 2017 at the Marina Theatre, Lowestoft. In 2018, Pernice announced that his Dance is Life tour would be returning in 2019.

In September 2020, Pernice & Anton Du Beke announced a 2021 UK Tour called HIM & ME.

In August 2022, Pernice announced he was to appear at Donaheys 2023 "Dancing With The Stars Weekends". He also has his solo tour called Made In Italy in 2023.

Personal life
Pernice dated strictly partner and actress Georgia May Foote in 2016, as well as Ashley Roberts, former member of The Pussycat Dolls, from 2018 to January 2020. In July 2021, Pernice confirmed that he was dating social media influencer and TV personality Maura Higgins. The pair split just 4 months later.

Notes

References

1990 births
Living people
People from Bologna
Italian male dancers
Italian expatriates in the United Kingdom
Strictly Come Dancing winners
People from Sicily